New Zealand won 6 medals at the 1994 Winter Paralympics: 3 golds, 0 silver and 3 bronze medals.

See also
 New Zealand at the Paralympics

References

External links
 International Paralympic Committee
 Paralympics New Zealand

Nations at the 1994 Winter Paralympics
1994
Paralympics